Samuel Fowler Bigelow (1837–1915) was an American judge, attorney and author in New Jersey.

He was the son of Moses Bigelow, who served as the Mayor of Newark, New Jersey, from 1857 to 1864.

He was educated at Newark Academy, Ashland Hall, and Freehold Institute. He graduated from Princeton College in 1857 and became City Attorney of Newark, New Jersey in 1863. He became a judge of the Newark City Court in 1868. President Grover Cleveland appointed him United States Attorney for the District of New Jersey. He also served as Supreme Court Commissioner for the Supreme Court of New Jersey and was appointed Special Master in Chancery by Chancellor William T. McGill. Judge Andrew Kirkpatrick appointed him as United States Commissioner for New Jersey. He wrote the book Biographical Sketch of Moses Bigelow (1890) about his father Moses Bigelow He was married to Lucy Paul Bigelow 1837-1924 on January 3, 1861 in Belvedere, Warren County, New Jersey.

References

1837 births
1915 deaths
19th-century American lawyers
Newark Academy alumni
City and town attorneys in the United States
United States Attorneys for the District of New Jersey
New Jersey lawyers
Politicians from Newark, New Jersey
American writers
American judges
Princeton University alumni